The Federation of Obstetric and Gynaecological Societies of India (FOGSI) is a professional organization representing practitioners of obstetrics and gynecology in India. With 262 member societies and over 37,000 individual members spread over the length and breadth of the country, FOGSI is probably one of the largest membership based organizations of specialized professionals.

History

FOGSI came into formal existence in Madras on January 6, 1950 at the sixth All India Congress of Obstetrics and Gynaecology, when the obstetric and gynecological societies of Ahmedabad, Bengal, Bombay, Madras and Punjab resolved to form themselves into the Federation of Obstetric and Gynaecological Societies of India. It was further resolved that the Federation be registered and headquartered in Bombay. The launch of FOGSI as the national organization of obstetricians and gynecologists followed five earlier All India Congresses, the first of these held in Madras in 1936 and organized by the then existing three obstetric and gynecological societies at Bombay, Kolkata and Madras.

The Indian College of Obstetrics and Gynecology is the academic wing of FOGSI with over 770 fellows. It was established by FOGSI on December 21, 1984 to further promote the education, training, research and knowledge in obstetrics, gynecology and reproductive health.

Operations

FOGSI exists to encourage and disseminate knowledge, education and research in the field of obstetrics and gynecology, to pilot and promote preventive and therapeutic services related to the practice of obstetrics and gynecology for betterment of the health of women and children in particular and the wellbeing of the community in general, to advocate the cause of reproductive health and rights and to support and protect the interest of practitioners of obstetrics and gynecology in India.

The Journal of Obstetrics and Gynecology of India is the official publication of FOGSI and is published bimonthly and circulated to every individual member. It contains articles and contributions on fundamental research and clinical practice as also case reports of clinical interest. With www.fogsi.org  the official website, FOGSI has an important presence in cyberspace which works to promote and fulfill the aims and objectives of the Federation.

The Federation continues to hold the All India Congress of Obstetrics and Gynaecology, its annual conference in January for four days. FOGSI also organizes Yuva FOGSI, four regional youth conferences to promote and showcase young talent each year. Besides these annual conferences many academic activities go on round the year throughout the country with twenty six subspecialty committees simultaneously working in their designated areas.

The Federation also collaborates with and partners the Government of India and is an invited reprehensive on all relevant policy making bodies of the government on issues related to women's health.

FOGSI has close links and affiliation with international and regional organizations like International Federation of Gynecology and Obstetrics (FIGO), AOFOG and SAFOG, with many of its members having occupied positions in these organizations from time to time.

Each year FOGSI  under the guidance the President selects a theme to highlight the importance of a particular issue related to women's health. This permits focus with the involvement of the large membership.

Leadership
 Dr. Hrishikesh D. Pai  - President
 Dr. Jaydeep Tank - President Elect 
 Dr. S. Shantha Kumari  - Immediate Past President
 Dr. Madhuri Patel - Secretary 
 Dr. Suvarna Khadilkar - Deputy General Secretary
 Dr. Alka Pandey - Vice President
 Dr. Asha Baxi - Vice President
 Dr. Geetendra Sharma - Vice President
 Dr. S. Sampathkumari - Vice President
 Dr. Yashodhara Pradeep - Vice President
 Dr. Parikshit Tank - Treasurer
 Dr. Niranjan Chavan - Joint Treasurer          
 Dr. Manisha Takhtani - Joint Secretary

Prizes and Awards
The FOGSI presents various prizes and awards annually during the AICOG conferences. They are:
 Mrs. Indumati Jhaveri Prizes
 Dr. C. S. Dawn Prizes
 Dr. Mrs. Jagdishwari Mishra Prizes
 Dr. C. L. Jhaveri Prizes for Miscellaneous category of Scientific Papers 
 Dr. Amarendra Nath Dan Prizes for the Best Papers on MCH Care
 Mrs. Chandravati Devi Jagannath Singh Prizes for the Best Papers on Oncology
 Dr. Mrs. Siuli Rudra Prizes for the Best Papers on Endoscopy
 Mr. Karan Gupta Memorial Prizes for the Best Papers
 Bhagwato Devi Yamuna Singh Prize for the Best Papers on Geriatric Gynaecology

References

External links
 Official website
 Journal of Obstetrics and Gynaecology of India
 Indian College of Obstetrics and Gynaecology

Medical associations based in India
Obstetrics and gynaecology organizations